Elections to Salford Council were held on 2 May 2002.  One third of the council was up for election.  The Labour Party kept overall control of the council. Overall turnout was 25.07%.

After the election, the composition of the council was:
Labour 52
Liberal Democrat 6
Conservative 2

Election result

|}

Ward results

References

2002
2002 English local elections
2000s in Greater Manchester